Pelitcik or Pelitçik can refer to the following villages in Turkey:

 Pelitcik, Bolu
 Pelitçik, Çamlıdere
 Pelitcik, Göynük
 Pelitçik, Kargı
 Pelitçik, Osmancık
 Pelitcik, Savaştepe